The Winter Album is the first compilation album by American boy band NSYNC. It was released in Germany on November 16, 1998.

Background
Following the release of the group's eponymous debut album, *NSYNC, in Germany in March 1997, NSYNC had mostly focused their attention on the British and American markets, releasing updated versions of the album in both territories in summer 1998, and preparing to release a seasonal album, Home for Christmas, in America for Christmas 1998. No material had been released in Germany since "Together Again", which was released on November 3, 1997. None of the tracks recorded for the British or American versions of their debut album had been released there, nor was any of the material recorded for Home for Christmas planned for release in Germany. So, the band decided that it was only fair that this material would be released there, as it was their support that kick-started their career and landed them a record deal with RCA Records. They took the five tracks recorded exclusively for the British and American editions of their debut album, and seven tracks from Home for Christmas, and packaged them together with a short interlude, "Family Affair", to create The Winter Album, made exclusively for release in Germany. The album was preceded by the lead single, "U Drive Me Crazy", which was released on September 29, 1998. The album was then released on November 17, and two weeks later, a second single, "Merry Christmas, Happy Holidays", was released to promote the album. The third and final single, "I Drive Myself Crazy", was released on February 22, 1999.

Track listing
Most of the lead vocals are provided by Justin Timberlake and JC Chasez.
"Everything I Own" has lead vocals provided by Chris Kirkpatrick, Joey Fatone, and Lance Bass.

Charts

References

1998 compilation albums
NSYNC albums